La mia poca grande età is the debut album by Italian singer-songwriter Alice, released under the stage name "Alice Visconti" in 1975 on CBS Records.

The album was re-released on CD in Japan in 2006 in Warner Music's European Rock Collection series.

Track listing
Side A
"Diciott'anni" (Stefano D'Orazio, Massimo Guantini) – 3:45
"Mi chiamo Alice" (Stefano D'Orazio, Renato Brioschi) – 4:28
"La mia estate" (Stefano D'Orazio, Salvatore Fabrizio) – 4:03
"Domani vado via" (Stefano D'Orazio, Salvatore Fabrizio) – 5:03
"Pensieri nel sole" (Stefano D'Orazio, Renato Brioschi) – 5:02
"È notte da un po'" (Stefano D'Orazio, Roberto Soffici) – 1:57
Side B
"Libera" (Stefano D'Orazio, Renato Brioschi) – 2:02
"Una casa solo mia" (Stefano D'Orazio, Roberto Soffici) – 4:02
"Sempre tu, sempre di più" (Stefano D'Orazio, Massimo Guantini) – 3:59
"Una giornata con mio padre" (Stefano D'Orazio, Dodi Battaglia) – 3:26
"Io voglio vivere" (Stefano D'Orazio, Renato Brioschi, Cristiano Minellono) – 5:02

Personnel
 Alice Visconti – lead vocals
 Danilo Vaona –  piano, backing vocals, Polymoog, Minimoog, Hammond organ, Eminent, mellotron, harpsichord, tubular bells
 Cosimo Fabiano – bass guitar
 Gianni D'Aquila – drums, timpani, percussion instruments
 Dody Battaglia – electric and acoustic guitar
 Enzo Giuffrè – electric and acoustic guitar
 Paola Orlandi, Lalla Francia, Mirella Bossi, Ornella Vanoni, Ezio Maria Picciotta – background vocals

Production
 Giancarlo Lucariello – record producer
 Danilo Vaona – musical arranger, orchestral conductor 
 Gualtiero Berlinghini – sound engineer
 Franco Santamaria – sound engineer
 Enzo De Rosa – sound engineer
 Recorded at Milano Recording Studios
 Luciano Tallarini – graphic design
 Mauro Balletti – photography

External links

1975 debut albums
Alice (singer) albums
Columbia Records albums
Italian-language albums